Noah Mozes (1912 – October 7, 1985) was an Israeli newspaper publisher, and the long-time managing editor of the Israeli newspaper Yedioth Aharonoth.

Biography
He was the son of Yehuda Mozes, and was initially an agronomist. He died on October 7, 1985, in Tel Aviv as a result of injuries incurred when he was hit by a city bus in a traffic accident, at the age of 73.  His son, Arnon, known as "Noni", replaced him as publisher.  His widow, Paula Mozes, died in 1997.

Media career
In 1955, he became the publisher and managing editor of the Israeli newspaper Yedioth Aharonoth, which in the late 1970s became Israel's biggest-selling newspaper.

Legacy
The Department of Communication and Journalism at The Hebrew University of Jerusalem was named after him in 1991, in a ceremony at which President Chaim Herzog spoke.

References

1912 births
1985 deaths
Israeli agronomists
Israeli newspaper editors
Israeli publishers (people)
Road incident deaths in Israel
20th-century agronomists